Gary Scott Campbell (June 22, 1957 – September 3, 2022) was a Canadian ice hockey defenceman who was drafted first overall by the Houston Aeros of the World Hockey Association (WHA) in the 1977 WHA Amateur Draft. Campbell was born in Toronto, Ontario, but grew up in Guelph, Ontario.

Playing career
After a stellar junior career with the London Knights, Campbell was selected first overall by the Houston Aeros of the World Hockey Association (WHA) in the 1977 WHA Amateur Draft, as well as ninth overall by the St. Louis Blues of the National Hockey League (NHL) in the 1977 NHL amateur draft. Campbell opted to join the Aeros.

Campbell played 149 WHA games for the Aeros and the Winnipeg Jets, and came to the NHL with the Jets when they joined that league in 1980. He and Morris Lukowich were the two players protected by the Jets from the dispersal draft, showing the faith the team had in his abilities. However, the cold weather in Winnipeg exacerbated a chronic asthma condition and he requested a trade after a season there. The asthma condition ultimately forced him into retirement at the age of 25 after briefly also playing for the St. Louis Blues.

Post hockey
After retiring from professional hockey, Campbell became involved in harness racing and found success as a stable owner. He died on September 3, 2022, from cancer.

Career statistics

References

External links

1957 births
2022 deaths
Canadian ice hockey defencemen
Houston Aeros (WHA) players
Houston Aeros draft picks
Sportspeople from Guelph
Ice hockey people from Toronto
London Knights players
National Hockey League first-round draft picks
Salt Lake Golden Eagles (CHL) players
St. Louis Blues draft picks
St. Louis Blues players
Tulsa Oilers (1964–1984) players
Winnipeg Jets (1979–1996) players
Winnipeg Jets (WHA) players
World Hockey Association first-overall draft picks
Canadian expatriate ice hockey players in the United States